Rory Thornton (born 16 March 1995) is a rugby union player who plays for the Cardiff Rugby. His position is lock forward.

Thornton began his rugby career at Bonymaen RFC before joining the Swansea RFC and then the Ospreys. Thornton joined Cardiff on a season long loan prior to the 2018-2019 Pro 14 season and then signed a permanent contract with Cardiff for the following season.

International

Thornton captained the Wales Under 20 team.

In January 2014 Thornton was called up to the Wales national rugby union team training squad for the 2015 Rugby World Cup. In May 2017 he was named in the Wales senior squad for the tests against Tonga and Samoa in June 2017

References

External links 
 Ospreys profile
Cardiff Blues profile

Rugby union players from Swansea
Welsh rugby union players
Ospreys (rugby union) players
Swansea RFC players
Living people
1995 births
Cardiff Rugby players
Rugby union locks
Wales international rugby union players